The Ice Hockey Federation of the Republic of Azerbaijan is the Azerbaijani national ice hockey federation.

History
The Ice Hockey Federation of the Republic of Azerbaijan was founded in 1991 as a part of the Soviet Ice Hockey Federation. After the Soviet Union had disintegrated, the Federation joined the International Ice Hockey Federation on May 6, 1992. There is no organized national hockey league in Azerbaijan, and the country has not played in any IIHF tournaments.

References

Azerbaijan
Azerbaijan
Ice Hockey
Sports organizations established in 1991
1991 establishments in Azerbaijan